Juraj Cebák (born 29 September 1982) is a Slovak ice hockey defenceman. He is currently a free agent.

Career statistics

Regular season and playoffs

External links

 

1982 births
Living people
People from Prievidza
Sportspeople from the Trenčín Region
HC '05 Banská Bystrica players
HC 07 Detva players
HC Bílí Tygři Liberec players
HC Košice players
MHk 32 Liptovský Mikuláš players
HC Vítkovice players
HK Dukla Trenčín players
HK Nitra players
HKM Zvolen players
MHC Martin players
MsHK Žilina players
Slovak ice hockey defencemen
Slovak expatriate ice hockey players in the Czech Republic